Meniellus is a genus of leaf beetles in the subfamily Eumolpinae. It is known from Africa.

Species
 Meniellus kohlschuetteri Weise, 1903
 Meniellus maculicollis (Jacoby, 1897)

References

Eumolpinae
Chrysomelidae genera
Beetles of Africa
Taxa named by Julius Weise